The Central Business District of Belapur (C.B.D Belapur) is a node of Navi Mumbai. The Navi Mumbai Municipal Corporation is headquartered in Belapur. The Reserve Bank of India maintains a branch office at CBD Belapur. This area is one of the fastest developing regions in Navi Mumbai in terms of new residential and commercial construction projects. CBD Belapur is connected to other parts of Mumbai through railways, BEST & NMMT buses. It had a ferry service for traveling to Elephanta caves from Sector-11.

CBD Belapur is a Central Business District of Mumbai Metropolitan Region after Vashi, Bandra-Kurla Complex, Nariman Point and Worli.

CBD Belapur has been growing since the 1990s, and is now home to colleges as well as a number of technology businesses.

History

The area near Belapur was under Portuguese rule around 1560, before it was captured by the Siddis of Janjira. In those days, the town was called Belawal by the locals, and Sambayo or Shabaz by the Portuguese. In 1682, the Portuguese recaptured Shabaz, only to lose it to the Marathas in 1733. In 1817, the British East India Company captured the area from the Marathas. It is the southernmost town in the Thane district as well as the Thane taluka.

Economy
CBD Belapur houses several economic and government administrative and private companies' offices (including government offices and banks).
Konkan Bhavan building houses several state government offices, like the Director of Town Planning and Public Works Department. The CGO Complex (Central Government Office) has offices of Chief Commissioner of Central Exice, Special Crime Branch, MTNL and Court. Other government offices include Cotton Corporation of India Ltd and the headquarters of Konkan Railway.

The Reserve Bank of India, State Bank of India (SBI), Bank of India, Punjab National Bank, Industrial Development Bank of India Limited (IDBI) and other nationalised banks have their presence here.

CBD Belapur is home to several call centres, including ChoiceConnex, Wipro BPO, Kaizen and SilkRoot. Belapur also has a Corporate office of India's leading staffing company Calibehr Business Support Service Pvt Ltd.
ChoiceConnex specialises in out-bound sales for US, Australia and UAE and has started domestic operations as well. It has markets for local population in sectors 3, 4, 5 & 6. It has M.G.M. Hospital which covers the local population's medical need with a new charitable hospital, Acharyashri Nanesh Hospital, situated in the artist village within Belapur. It has a number of restaurants and recreational grounds such as Sunil Gavaskar Maidan.
International Technology Centre at the CBD Belapur railway station complex was built by CIDCO as an Infotech hub.

Administrative offices
CBD Belapur is also important as regards to administrative purpose as many central, state and local government offices are situated here: 
 Konkan Bhavan (Various State Government Departments)
 CGO (Central Government Offices Complex)
 NMMC (Navi Mumbai Municipal Corporation)
 CIDCO Bhavan ( Head office of City and Industrial Development Corporation)

Transport
CBD belapur is going to be connected soon by the new international airport, Navi Mumbai International Airport(NMIA).
CBD Belapur is accessible from other parts of Navi Mumbai and from Mumbai by road and rail transport facilities. Belapur railway station lies on the harbour line and Sion Panvel Highway passes through this node. Palm Beach Marg connects CBD Belapur directly with Vashi. Railway service is up to Panvel.

BEST buses are available from CBD Belapur to Kharghar, Kalamboli, Vashi, Chembur, Sion, Dadar, Bandra and Ghatkopar. NMMT buses are available from CBD Belapur to Vashi, Koper Khairane, Ghansoli, Thane, Dombivli, Kalyan, Badlapur, Uran, Kharghar, Taloja, Kalamboli, Panvel and Khopoli. NMMT AC Volvo buses are available from CBD Belapur to Vashi, Panvel, Kharghar, Chembur, Sion, Dadar, Bandra and Borivali.
Auto rickshaws is the primary mode of transport within the node owing the small area occupied by the node.NMMT Routes in CBD BelapurBEST Routes in CBD Belapur'''

Nature
Belapur is surrounded by greenery and it is much more organized than other parts of Navi Mumbai. There are a couple of waterfalls situated in sector 8B, where people come for trekking and nature trails. This area is called Artist Colony where you will find amazing natural space to chill out with your dear ones near waterfalls and pond. There are other open spaces in and around Belapur such as Mango garden, Belapur Jetty, Belapur Fort, Parsik Hills and much more to explore around Nerul and Kharghar as well.

Nightlife 
Belapur has a variety of options in the nightlife and it is crowded with lounges of Navi Mumbai. It has the largest no. of high end restaurants than any other node of Navi Mumbai.

Law and order

The office of police commissioner Of Navi Mumbai is at CBD Belapur Sector 10. A police station is also at sector 1.

Other business districts of Mumbai
Fort (Mumbai precinct)
Nariman Point
Colaba
Vashi
Worli
Bandra Kurla Complex

References

Nodes of Navi Mumbai
Economy of Navi Mumbai
Central business districts in India